Boulengerula uluguruensis, the Uluguru pink caecilian or Uluguru African caecilian, is a species of amphibian in the family Caeciliidae. It is endemic to Tanzania where it is found in the Nguu, Nguru, and Uluguru Mountains.
Its natural habitats are subtropical or tropical moist lowland forests, subtropical or tropical moist montane forests, rural gardens, and heavily degraded former forest.

References

uluguruensis
Amphibians of Tanzania
Endemic fauna of Tanzania
Taxa named by Thomas Barbour
Taxa named by Arthur Loveridge
Amphibians described in 1928
Taxonomy articles created by Polbot